Yana Jaqhi (Aymara yana dark, jaqhi cliff, "dark cliff", hispanicized spelling Yanajaque) is a mountain in the Wallanka mountain range in the Andes of Peru which reaches an altitude of approximately . It is located in the Ancash Region, Bolognesi Province, Huasta District, west of Chawpi Hanka.

References 

Mountains of Peru
Mountains of Ancash Region